The National Operations Council (NOC) or Majlis Gerakan Negara (MAGERAN) was an emergency administrative body which attempted to restore law and order in Malaysia after the 13 May incident in 1969, in the wake of the racial rioting which  broke out in the federal capital of Kuala Lumpur.

The NOC was announced on 15 May 1969, with Tun Razak as Director of Operations, although the other council members were not announced until 17 May.  From 1969 to 1971, the NOC governed the country in lieu of the elected government. In 1971, the NOC was dissolved with the restoration of Parliament.

Members of the Council
The Director of Operations of NOC was Tun Razak.  The Prime Minister Tunku Abdul Rahman was not formally a member, but was consulted on major decisions for approval.

Councils Members
 Minister of Home Affairs — Tun Dr. Ismail
 Minister of Finance — Tun Tan Siew Sin
 Minister of Works, Post & Telecoms — Tun Sambanthan
 Minister of Information & Broadcasting — Enche Hamzah bin Dato' Abu Samah
 Director-General of Public Services Department and later Chief Secretary to the Government - Tan Sri Abdul Kadir Shamsuddin
 Chief of Armed Forces Staff — Tunku Osman Jiwa
 Inspector-General of Police — Tan Sri Mohamed Salleh bin Ismael
 Permanent Secretary, Ministry of Foreign Affairs — Tan Sri Muhammad Ghazali Shafie

The Chief Executive Officer
 Director of Operations, West Malaysia — Lt. Gen. Dato' Ibrahim bin Ismail

Assistants
Deputy Secretary, Ministry of Defence — Enche Abdul Rahman Hamidon
Ministry of Defence — Lt. Col. Ghazali bin Che Mat
Royal Malaysia Police — Superintendent Mohammed Hanif Omar
Attorney-General's Office - Enche Yusoff bin Abdul Rashid

References

Former federal ministries, departments and agencies of Malaysia
1969 establishments in Malaysia
1971 disestablishments in Malaysia
Organizations established in 1969
Organizations disestablished in 1971
Political history of Malaysia